Volodymyr Leonidovych Kvurt (1 August 1967 – 28 December 2022) was a Ukrainian entrepreneur and politician. A member of European Solidarity, he served on the Lviv Oblast Council from 2020 to 2022.

Kvurt died on 28 December 2022, at the age of 55.

References

1967 births
2022 deaths
21st-century Ukrainian politicians
Members of the Lviv Oblast Council
Lviv Polytechnic alumni
University of Lviv alumni
National Academy of State Administration alumni
People from Kyiv Oblast